Sophia Hadjipanteli (born 25 May 1997) is a Greek Cypriot model, most notable for her unibrow look. She initially gained public attention in the UK in 2017 and first appeared in fashion shows during London's Fashion week 2020. She has modeled for brands including Guess Jeans and Polaroid.

Early life and education 
Hadjipanteli was born and raised in Cyprus. She emigrated from Cyprus to the United States with her father and brother. She claims to have been inspired to have a unibrow by her family and culture. She studied marketing at the University of Maryland where she started modeling for brands like Hugo Boss or Guess. She has nicknamed her unique eyebrows "Veronica."

Modeling career 

Hadjipanteli is signed to Premier Model Management and MUSE NYC. She appeared in more than 50 publications worldwide, including, Vogue, Elle, Harper's Bazaar, New York Times and Vanity Fair. She has worked for fashion brands including Chanel and Fenty Beauty as well as done catwalk work.

Activism 
In response to public backlash about her looks, Hadjipanteli founded the #UnibrowMovement to promote unconventional beauty and embrace her heritage. She has accumulated more than 380,000 followers on Instagram and received death threats for her remarks and appearance. She has been outspoken in her support of "body-positive" female imagery.

Personal life 
As of 2019, Hadjipanteli was reported to be in a relationship with London-based photographer, Zac Apostolou.

References

External links 

 Linkedin profile

Cypriot models
University System of Maryland alumni
Living people
Female models
1997 births